Arni is a former municipality in the Karditsa regional unit, Thessaly, Greece. Since the 2011 local government reform it is part of the municipality Sofades, of which it is a municipal unit. The municipal unit has an area of 89.185 km2. Population 2,604 (2011). The seat of the municipality was in Mataragka. It was named after the ancient Aeolian town Arne, which was located near present Mataragka.

References

Populated places in Karditsa (regional unit)

el:Δήμος Σοφάδων#Άρνης